"Breadline" is a song by American heavy metal band Megadeth and the second single from their eighth studio album, Risk, in late 1999. "Breadline" was also released as its own EP in 2000 in Japan, which featuring several versions of the song, and remixes of other songs from Risk and Megadeth's back catalog. After leaving Megadeth, guitarist Marty Friedman would later cover this song on his solo album Future Addict.

Background 
"Breadline" is about homelessness and poverty in America. 

The song has been played 46 times live by the band. An early version titled "Dancin' On The Breadline" received a test pressing single on February 12, 1999.

Track listing

Charts

Personnel 
Credits are adapted from the album's liner notes.
Megadeth
 Dave Mustaine – guitars, lead vocals
 David Ellefson – bass, backing vocals
 Marty Friedman – guitars
 Jimmy DeGrasso – drums
Production
Produced by Dann Huff; Co-produced by Dave Mustaine
Mixed and engineered by Jeff Balding with Mark Hagen
Mastered by Bob Ludwig
2004 reissue
Produced by Dave Mustaine
Mixed by Ralph Patlan and Dave Mustaine
Engineered by Ralph Patlan with Lance Dean
Edited by Lance Dean, Scott "Sarge" Harrison, and Keith Schreiber with Bo Caldwell
Mastered by Tom Baker

References 

Megadeth songs
1999 songs
2000 singles
Capitol Records singles
Albums produced by Dann Huff